Chauncey Fitch Cleveland (February 16, 1799 – June 6, 1887) was an American politician, a United States representative and the 31st Governor of Connecticut.

Biography
Born in Canterbury, Connecticut, Cleveland attended the common schools and taught school from the age of fifteen to twenty. He studied law, was admitted to the bar in 1819 and commenced practice in Hampton. He was married, December 13, 1821, to Diantha Hovey (1800–1867); was married, January 22, 1869, to Helen Cornelia Litchfield.

Career
Cleveland was a member of the Connecticut House of Representatives from 1826 to 1829, 1832, 1835, 1836, 1838, 1847, and 1848, and served as its speaker in 1836 and 1838. He was State's attorney in 1832 and State bank commissioner in 1838. In 1841 he moved to Norwich, Connecticut.

Elected Governor of the state by the Democratic party in 1842, and again in 1843, Cleveland was Governor of Connecticut from May 4, 1842 to May 1, 1844.  He then resumed the practice of law in Hampton.

Elected as a Democrat to the Thirty-first and Thirty-second Congresses, Cleveland held office from March 4, 1849 to March 3, 1853.

Previous to the breaking out of the Civil War, Cleveland had become affiliated with the Republican Party upon its organization. He was a strong supporter of the government during the war, and for several years thereafter he acted with that party. He was a delegate to the Republican National Conventions of 1856 and 1860, and was a Presidential Elector on the Republican ticket in 1860. In 1861, he was a member of the Peace Congress held in Washington, D.C. in an effort to devise means to prevent the impending war.

Cleveland was again a member of the State house of representatives in 1863 and 1866, serving as speaker in the former year. He retired from public life and engaged in agricultural pursuits and the practice of law.

Death
Cleveland died in Hampton in 1887. He is interred at South Cemetery, Hampton, Connecticut.

References

External links

1799 births
1887 deaths
Connecticut lawyers
Speakers of the Connecticut House of Representatives
Governors of Connecticut
Democratic Party governors of Connecticut
Republican Party members of the Connecticut House of Representatives
Democratic Party members of the United States House of Representatives from Connecticut
People from Canterbury, Connecticut
19th-century American politicians
19th-century American lawyers